State Highway 29 (SH-29) is a  state highway in Idaho. SH-29 runs from SH-28 in Leadore to Montana Secondary Highway 324 (S-324) at the Montana state line at Bannock Pass.

Route description
SH-29 begins at an intersection with SH-28 in the town of Leadore. The highway continues northeast as Railroad Canyon Road before turning north and entering the forest. The road curves through the mountains until it reaches the Montana state line at Bannock Pass, where it becomes Montana Secondary Highway 324.

Junction list

See also

 List of state highways in Idaho
 List of highways numbered 29

References

External links

029
Transportation in Lemhi County, Idaho